Derek Turner (born 1964 in Dublin, Ireland) is a journalist and author of several novels.

Early life 
Turner is the son of a ship’s captain of Methodist background; and Church of Ireland mother (the great niece of the Archbishop of Dublin). Before he became a journalist, he worked as a sailor, security guard, builder, advertising salesman for the Daily Telegraph, and production editor for a technical publishing firm.

Journalism
Turner's work has appeared in a large number of magazines and newspapers, including The Times, The Sunday Telegraph, Literary Review, Salisbury Review, Taki's Magazine, Economist, European Journal, The Lady Magazine, and Kent Life. His articles appeared in the American magazines Chronicles, and the Connor Post, German Junge Freiheit, and Criticón, and other journals in France, Italy, the Czech Republic and elsewhere.

He was editor of the rightwing magazine Right Now! which was published by Taki Theodoracopulos. 

He edited the Quarterly Review from 2007 to 2011.

His areas of focus are English letters, British topography, European culture and history, folklore, and current affairs.

Novels
Turner is the author of three novels: Sea Changes, A Modern Journey, and Displacement.

Published works
 Sea Changes (WSP, 2012) 
 Displacement (Endeavour Press, 2015) 
 A Modern Journey (Endeavour Press, 2016)

References

External links
Official Website

1964 births
Living people
Irish journalists
British journalists
Far-right politics in England